Zara McFarlane is a British jazz/soul singer and songwriter, based in East London. In October 2014, McFarlane was awarded the title of "Best Jazz Act" at the MOBO Awards. She has had four albums released by Brownswood Recordings.

Early life
Zara McFarlane was born in London in 1983 and grew up on the borders of east London and Essex. She was born to parents of Jamaican heritage, which has had a big influence on her musical tastes. She studied musical theatre at the BRIT School, then went on to the London College of Music to study Popular Music Performance and completed a master's degree in jazz studies (vocals) at the Guildhall School of Music and Drama.

McFarlane came up through Tomorrow's Warriors, where she met many of the musicians she performs and collaborates with today.

Later life and career
McFarlane's debut album, Until Tomorrow, was released by Brownswood Recordings in 2011. Her second album, If You Knew Her, was released in 2014, also by Brownswood. She accompanied herself on guitar on "You'll Get Me in Trouble". The New York Times reviewer of the album commented that "its identity derives from Ms. McFarlane's clear, elegant voice, and the musicians' training and influences". Her next album, Arise, was released by the same label in 2017. She has collaborated with Denys Baptiste, Orphy Robinson, Soweto Kinch and Jazz Jamaica.

McFarlane's "If You Knew Her" tour in 2014 was praised by John Fordham in The Guardian, describing her as having "magnetic eloquence". She has made television appearances on programmes around Europe, including Later... with Jools Holland (BBC Two), Un Lugar Llamado Mundo and the live broadcast of Victoires du Jazz. She has also made radio appearances worldwide, with her most notable appearances on Jamie Cullum's show on BBC Radio 2, NTS Radio and TSF Jazz.

Discography

As leader
 Until Tomorrow (Brownswood, 2011)
 If You Knew Her (Brownswood, 2014)
 Arise (Brownswood, 2017)
 Songs of an Unknown Tongue (Brownswood, 2020)

As guest
 Brownswood Bubblers Seven, Gilles Peterson (Brownswood, 2011)
 Christmas Soul, Barbara Dennerlein and Magnus Lindgren (MPS, 2015)

References

External links 
 Official Zara McFarlane website
 Zara McFarlane Discography at Discogs

Year of birth missing (living people)
Living people
British women singer-songwriters
British women jazz singers
British soul singers
Brownswood Recordings artists